Vučipolje (Cyrillic: Вучипоље) can refer to the following places:

Bosnia and Herzegovina
 Vučipolje (Bugojno), a village in the municipality of Bugojno
 Vučipolje (Posušje), a village in the municipality of Posušje

Croatia
 Vučipolje, Zadar County, a village in the municipality of Gračac in the southern part of Lika
 Vučipolje, Split-Dalmatia County, a village in the municipality of Hrvace in the Split-Dalmatia County

Notes